The Bloody Judge is a 1970 horror film directed by Jesús Franco and written by Enrico Colombo, Jesús Franco, Michael Haller, and Anthony Scott Veitch. The film stars Christopher Lee, Maria Schell, Leo Genn, Hans Hass Jr., Maria Rohm and Margaret Lee. The film was released in Italy on February 5, 1970.

Plot
This film is loosely based on the story of Judge Jeffries, the Lord Chief Justice of seventeenth-century England, who in this film, condemned women as witches to further his political and sexual needs.

Cast

Production
According to Harry Alan Towers' biographer Dave Mann, the collaborations between director Jesús Franco and Towers were fraught with difficulties. Franco explained that Towers liked doing co-productions with others and that the film was going to be an Anglo-American-German-Spanish-French-Italian co-production. This led to many changes to suit producers in each country's needs, with Franco recalling that the film was at first a horror film with a historical backdrop, then more of a historical film with a background of inquisition, then primarily about the inquisition, then an erotic film.

Release
The Bloody Judge was released in Italy on 5 February 1970. It was later released in West Germany on 5 June 1970. The film was released in Spain on 20 April 1971 as Proceso de las Brujas. The film had 688,928 admissions in Spain.
It was released on DVD in the UK by Salvation Films in 1999.

References

Sources

External links
 

1970 films
1970 horror films
1970s historical horror films
Italian historical horror films
West German films
German historical horror films
Spanish historical horror films
1970s English-language films
English-language German films
English-language Italian films
English-language Spanish films
Films directed by Jesús Franco
Films scored by Bruno Nicolai
Films set in London
Films set in England
Films set in the 1680s
Folk horror films
1970s Italian films
1970s German films
1970s Spanish films